Youssef Kerkour is a Moroccan-British actor. He is best known for portraying Syrian refugee Sami in the comedy-drama series Home, a role for which he was nominated at the 2020 British Academy Television Awards.

Early life and education 
Kerkour grew up in Rabat, Morocco. His father was a Moroccan mathematics professor and his mother an English school teacher; they had met in France in the 1960s and moved together to Morocco. As a child, Kerkour loved to sing and dance, and idolised Bruce Lee after his father took him to a screening of the film Enter the Dragon. In his early teens, Kerkour took a school trip to Stratford-upon-Avon, England, the home town of William Shakespeare, and attended a production of Henry V; he credits this experience with inspiring his love of acting. Kerkour moved to the United States to study psychology at Bard College, but spent much of his time taking dance and acting classes instead. He began pursuing an acting career at the encouragement of a university professor.

Career 

In 2001, Kerkour played The Visitor in a production of the Steve Martin play Picasso at the Lapin Agile. Unable to obtain a visa to remain in the United States, Kerkour moved to England and continue his acting career. He spent two years at the London Academy of Music and Dramatic Art, and five years with the Royal Shakespeare Company.

Kerkour starred in the comedy-drama series Home, which debuted in March 2019 and lasted two series. In the series, he played Sami Ibrahim, a Syrian asylum seeker who moves in with a middle-class English family. The role was based on the experiences of real-ife Syrian refugee Hassan Akkad. Kerkour had not expected to be cast as Sami, since it was such a departure from the typecast violent characters he would usually play. In 2020, he said:"I spent my life playing terrorists. That’s my USP, that's why I grew my beard. I'm a very big guy. I speak Arabic, so a big bearded Arabic man, there’s really one kind of part, traditionally. [Playing] Sami is the first time somebody has taken the chance and given me something more."For his role as Sami, Kerkour was nominated for Best Male Comedy Performance at the 2020 British Academy Television Awards, losing the award to Jamie Demetriou (for Stath Lets Flats). Kerkour is slated to appear in a film adaptation of The Alchemist, alongside Sebastian de Souza and Tom Hollander.

In 2021, Kerkour starred in Ridley Scott film House of Gucci, playing the role of Iraqi Turkmen financier Nemir Kirdar. He is also set to appear in Scott's upcoming Napoleon Bonaparte drama Kitbag, alongside Joaquin Phoenix.

Personal life 
As of 2021, Kerkour is married and has a two-year-old daughter. He has lived in London for two decades, and describes himself as a "notorious coffee drinker" in the cafes of Soho.

Filmography

Film

Television

Video games

References

External links 
 

Living people
Moroccan actors
British actors
Year of birth missing (living people)